Sunburst Finish is the third studio album by English rock band Be-Bop Deluxe, released in February 1976. It was recorded in Abbey Road Studios, London.

The album contains what would become one of their few forays into chart success; the February 1976 single , which reached number 23 in the UK Singles Chart.

Keyboardist Andy Clark, who had served as a temporary member during  1975 Futurama tour, joined the band as a full member for this album.

The album marked the production debut of John Leckie, who would later produce artists such as Simple Minds, XTC, The Stone Roses and Radiohead. It was re-released in early 1991 with three bonus tracks. 

Q Magazine described it as the band's 'finest hour' where 'Bill's lyrical excesses are held in check while the band belt out track after track of uniquely futuristic pop'.

Musical style 

The music of Sunburst Finish has been classified as art rock, pop rock and progressive pop.

Track listing 
All songs written by Bill Nelson.

"Fair Exchange" – 4:49 
"Heavenly Homes" – 3:36 
"Ships in the Night" – 4:03
"Crying to the Sky" – 3:57
"Sleep That Burns" – 5:16 
"Beauty Secrets" – 2:47 
"Life in the Air Age" – 3:59
"Like an Old Blues" – 3:27
"Crystal Gazing" – 3:24
"Blazing Apostles" – 4:29
"Shine" (Reissue bonus track)
"Speed of the Wind" (Reissue bonus track)
"Blue as a Jewel" (Reissue bonus track)

Personnel
Be-Bop Deluxe
 Bill Nelson – electric and 12-string guitars, lead vocals, cover concept
 Andy Clark – keyboards, synthesizer
 Charlie Tumahai – bass guitar, backing vocals
 Simon Fox – drums
with:
 Ian Nelson – alto saxophone on "Ships in the Night"
Andrew Powell – orchestral arrangements on "Like an Old Blues" and "Crystal Gazing"

Cover photograph
John Thornton photographed the cover based on a concept by Mike Doud. The model was Nicky Howarth Dwek.

References

External links

Be Bop Deluxe Discography
 

1976 albums
Pop rock albums by English artists
Progressive pop albums
Albums produced by John Leckie
Harvest Records albums
Be-Bop Deluxe albums